Charles Watson "Charley" Mitchell (24 November 1861-3 April 1918) was an English world heavyweight boxing title contender and lightweight champion.

Professional career
Mitchell was born on 24 November, 1861 in the city of Birmingham, England. Mitchell had exceptional ability at using London Prize Ring Rules to his advantage. During his career, he engaged in over 100 fights with both gloves and bare-knuckles, using the London Prize Ring Rules as well as the Queensberry Rules. He often fought men who outweighed him by 30 to 40 pounds. Mitchell took on all comers in London, often fighting as many as four bouts in one night.

In 1880 he became the boxing instructor for the International Athletic Club at the "White Rose" in London, and opened a boxing school at the "Palais Rubens" in Antwerp, Belgium.

In 1882 Billy Madden, the former tutor and backer of John L Sullivan, put on an openweight boxing tournament in England, in order to find a challenger for John L Sullivan. This was a professional tournament, held under amateur rules, consisting of 3 3 minute rounds, with an extra 2 minute round being fought in the case of draws,  A number of prominent boxers including Jem Goode and Jack Knifton entered. Despite being both the youngest and lightest of the 21 competitors, Mitchell won the tournament. 

Mitchell toured the United States and Canada with Jake Kilrain, and later Frank "Paddy" Slavin, putting on exhibitions, sometimes daily and sometimes on the same day as one of his fights. Mitchell was in Kilrain's corner on 8 July 1889 when he fought John L. Sullivan for the world heavyweight boxing championship.

Mitchell came from Birmingham, England and fought John L. Sullivan in 1883, knocking him down in the first round. Their second meeting took place in 1888 on the grounds of a chateau at Chantilly, France in driving rain. It went on for more than two hours, at the end of which both men were unrecognisable and had suffered much loss of blood; neither could lift his arms to punch and the contest was considered a draw.

The local gendarmerie arrived at this point and managed to arrest Mitchell, who spent the next few days in a cell and was later fined by the local magistrate, boxing being illegal in France at that time. Sullivan managed to evade the law, swathed in bandages, and was taken back across the English Channel to spend the next few weeks convalescing in Liverpool. Mitchell acted as Sullivan's corner man for many years after.

In 1894 Mitchell fought in his most noteworthy bout, against James J Corbett for the world heavyweight championship. Corbett won by KO in the 3rd round, winning $20,000.

Death
Mitchell died on 3 April 1918 in Hove at age 56.

Honors
Mitchell was inducted into the Ring Magazine's Boxing Hall of Fame in 1957, and inducted into the International Boxing Hall of Fame (2002).

References

External links
 
CBZ page

World lightweight boxing champions
1861 births
1918 deaths
English male boxers
International Boxing Hall of Fame inductees
Boxers from Birmingham, West Midlands
Neurological disease deaths in England